Robbins is an unincorporated community in Johnson County, in the U.S. state of Missouri.

History
A variant spelling was "Robins". A post office called Robins was established in 1892, and remained in operation until 1904. The community has the name of Henry Clay Robbins, an early settler.

References

Unincorporated communities in Johnson County, Missouri
Unincorporated communities in Missouri